Vitamin D3 dihydroxylase is a cytochrome P450 enzyme purified from the actinobacterium Streptomyces griseolus, with EC number  and CYP Symbol CYP105A1 (Cytochrome P450, family 105, member A1), catalyses oxidation of cholecalciferol(vitamin D3) to calcitriol.

References 

EC 1.14.15
105